Sphyradium is a genus of very small air-breathing land snails, terrestrial pulmonate gastropod mollusks in the family Orculidae within the superfamily Pupilloidea.

Species
Species within the genus Sphyradium include:
 Sphyradium doliolum (Bruguière, 1792)
Synonyms
 Sphyradium alexanderi Pilsbry & C. M. Cooke, 1906: synonym of Columella alexanderi (Pilsbry & C. M. Cooke, 1906) (original combination)
 Sphyradium dobrogicum Grossu, 1986: synonym of Sphyradium doliolum (Bruguière, 1792) (junior synonym)
 Sphyradium hasta Hanna, 1911: synonym of Columella hasta (Hanna, 1911)
 Sphyradium himalayanum (Benson, 1863): synonym of Truncatellina himalayana'' (Benson, 1863) (unaccepted combination)
 Sphyradium parreyssii (L. Pfeiffer, 1848): synonym of Agardhiella parreyssii (L. Pfeiffer, 1848) (superseded combination)
 Sphyradium sharpi Pilsbry & C. M. Cooke, 1906: synonym of Columella sharpi'' (Pilsbry & C. M. Cooke, 1906) (original combination)

References

 Schileyko, A. A. (1998). Treatise on Recent terrestrial pulmonate molluscs. Part 1. Achatinellidae, Amastridae, Orculidae, Strobilopsidae, Spelaeodiscidae, Valloniidae, Cochlicopidae, Pupillidae, Chondrinidae, Pyramidellidae. Ruthenica. Supplement 2: 1-127. Moskva 
  Sysoev, A. V. & Schileyko, A. A. (2009). Land snails and slugs of Russia and adjacent countries. Sofia/Moskva (Pensoft). 312 pp., 142 plates.
 Gittenberger, E. (1978). Beiträge zur Kenntnis der Pupillacea VIII. Einiges über Orculidae. Zoologische Verhandelingen, 163: 1-44, pl. 1-4. Leiden

External links
 Charpentier, J. de. (1837). Catalogue des mollusques terrestres et fluviatiles de la Suisse. Nouveaux Mémoires de la Société Helvétique des Sciences Naturelles [Neue Denkschriften der allg. Schweizerischen Gesellschaft für die gesammten Naturwisshenschaften. 1 (2): 1-28, pls 1-2. Neuchâtel.]
 Cecconi, G. (1908). Contributo alla fauna delle Isolie Tremiti. Bollettino dei Musei di Zoologia ed Anatomia Comparata della R. Università di Torino. 23(583): 1-53
 Dall, W. H. (1904). Notes on the nomenclature of the Pupacea and associated forms. The Nautilus. 17(10): 114-116
Cockerell, T. D. A. (1905). Note on the nomenclature of the snails usually called Pupa. The Nautilus. 18(9): 103-105

Orculidae